The Raymond Lagacé Trophy is awarded annually to the Defensive Rookie of the Year in the Quebec Major Junior Hockey League. Prior to 1980, there was only one Rookie of the Year trophy, the Michel Bergeron Trophy, which was awarded to the Overall Rookie of the Year.

Winners

External links
 QMJHL official site List of trophy winners.

Quebec Major Junior Hockey League trophies and awards